Terrier Oriole is an unguided two-stage rocket system which is primarily used by the Goddard Space Flight Center out of the Wallops Flight Facility as a sounding rocket. The system uses a Terrier first-stage booster attached to an Oriole second-stage rocket. It is also used to test ballistic missile defense systems, under the name ARAV-B.

Technical details 

There is a  interstage adapter between the Terrier and Oriole systems, which allows for drag separation following Terrier burnout. The Oriole stage uses four fins in a cruciform configuration, which are canted in order to provide a spin rate of four revolutions per second upon Oriole burnout.

Standard hardware includes a nose cone and capacitive discharge ignition system. Separation systems are available for use in order to separate the payload from the motor during ascent. An ogive nose cone is also available to users, when required.

Terrier-Oriole is used to test ballistic missile defense systems, under the name Aegis Readiness Assessment Vehicle-B (ARAV-B). It is much cheaper than other ballistic missile targets.

T4-E
This T-T-O stack uses two Terrier Mk.70 (TX-664) plus the final Oriole GEM-22 as a medium range ballistic missile (MRBM) target.

In mid-November 2022, the T4-E stack was used for two live-fire events when Japanese Navy ships JS Maya and JS Haguro used RIM-161 SM-3 Block IIA missiles to engage T4-E targets in conjunction with the US Navy at the Pacific Missile Range Facility, Kauai Island, Hawaii.

See also 
 Terrier Malemute
 Terrier-Orion

References 

Sounding rockets of the United States